St. George's College, Agra, is one of the oldest convent schools in India. It is a Minority Anglo-Indian Christian Institution granted Minority Rights under Article 30 of the Indian Constitution. It is located near Mall Road and near to Targhar. The campus is approximately .The students are widely named as Georgians in the city. The school is accredited under the Indian Certificate of Secondary Education board for grade 10th and under the Indian School Certificate board for Grade 12. The school was established in 1875 as an Army School for British Armed Forces at Agra. With the passing by of time it started admitting students from civilian background as well. The college originated in a school set up by Father Joseph Rooney, an Irish priest from Navan, in the late 1840s. Rooney later founded St Peter's College, a Catholic boys school in Agra.

Headmasters and principals

Headmasters
Edward W. Maylor (1875 - 1882)
G. H. Johnson (1888 - 1894)
Rev. L. F. Philips (1895 - 1910)
S.T. Rollo (1895 - 1910)
Rev. Ben Colton (1911 - 1912)
Rev. F. H. Smith (1913 - 1915)
Norman H. Tubby (1916 - 1919)
Rev. N. Rose Burnett (1920 - 1923)
H. A. Phillips (1924 - 1926)

Principals
T. D. Ayo (1926 - 1933)
Capt. M. C. Ellis (1933 - 1934)
E. C. Ellis (1943 – 1946)
Maj. M. C. Ellis (1946 – 1947)
I. Montes (1947 – 1948)
Richard Stephen Law (1949 - 1970)
B. Roberts (1970 - 1972)
A. R. David (1973 - 1979)
I. V. Phillips (1980 - 1992)
J. S. Jeremiah (1992-2022)
Akshay R.S Jeremiah (2022-Present)

References

External links
 Official Website 

Christian schools in Uttar Pradesh
High schools and secondary schools in Uttar Pradesh
Education in Agra
Educational institutions established in 1875
1875 establishments in India